Year 1402 (MCDII) was a common year starting on Sunday (link will display the full calendar) of the Julian calendar.

Events 
 January–December 
 January 29 – King Jogaila of the Poland–Lithuania Union answers the rumblings against his rule of Poland, by marrying Anna of Celje, a granddaughter of Casimir III of Poland.
 March 26 – David Stewart, Duke of Rothesay, heir to the throne of Scotland, dies while being held captive by his uncle, Robert Stewart, 1st Duke of Albany.
 May 21 – Following the death of Queen Maria of Sicily, her husband Martin I of Sicily, now sole ruler, marries Blanche of Navarre.
 June 22
 Battle of Nesbit Moor: An English force decisively defeats a returning Scottish raiding party.
 Battle of Bryn Glas: Welsh rebels under Owain Glyndŵr defeat the English on the England/Wales border. The Welsh capture Edmund Mortimer, son of the 3rd Earl, who defects to the Welsh cause, on 30 November marrying Owain's daughter Catrin.
 June 26 – Battle of Casalecchio: Gian Galeazzo Visconti, the Duke of Milan, crushes the forces of Bologna and Florence, but dies from a fever later this year and is succeeded by his son, Gian Maria Visconti.
 July 12 – The Ming dynasty prince Zhu Di and his army occupy the Ming capital, Nanjing. The Jianwen Emperor is either lost or killed and Zhu Di takes over the throne as the Yongle Emperor, marking the end of the Jingnan campaign.
 July 20 – Battle of Ankara: An invading Timurid Empire force defeats the Ottoman Sultan Bayezid I, who is captured.  A period of interregnum begins in the Ottoman Empire, with the future Mehmed I as one of the leading claimants to the throne. After Serbia is freed from Ottoman rule, Stefan Lazarević is crowned Despot of Serbia.
 September – The English Parliament passes penal Laws against Wales which stop the Welsh from gathering together, obtaining office, carrying arms and living in English towns. Any Englishman who marries a Welsh woman also comes under the laws.
 September 14 – Battle of Homildon Hill: Northern English nobles, led by Sir Henry Percy (Hotspur), and using longbows, decisively defeat a Scottish raiding army and capture their leader, the Earl of Douglas.

 Date unknown 
 The Malacca Sultanate is established at Melaka Darul Azim (modern-day Melaka Darul Azim, Malaysia).
 After the Christian Knights of Saint John, who are ruling Smyrna, refuse to convert to Islam or pay tribute, Timur has the entire population massacred. The Knights subsequently begin building Bodrum Castle in Bodrum, to defend against future attacks.
 Conquest of the Canary Islands: King Henry III of Castile sends French explorer Jean de Béthencourt to colonize the Canary Islands. Béthencourt receives the title King of the Canary Islands but recognizes Henry as his overlord. This marks the beginning of the Spanish Empire.
 The Republic of Genoa regains control of Monaco.
 The Aq Qoyunlu ("White Sheep Turkmen") tribal confederation, in modern-day northern Iraq and Iran, moves its capital from Amida to Diyarbakır.
 Moldavia becomes a vassal of the Kingdom of Poland in order to protect itself from an invasion by Hungary.
 Maria II Zaccaria succeeds her husband, Pedro de San Superano, as regent of the Principality of Achaea (modern-day southern Greece).
 Conchobar an Abaidh mac Maelsechlainn O Cellaigh succeeds Maelsechlainn mac William Buidhe O Cellaigh, as King of Uí Maine in modern-day County Galway and County Roscommon in Ireland.
 The University of Würzburg is founded.
 The Gangnido map of the world is completed in Joseon dynasty Korea.
 A Great comet is sighted.
 A big fire in the city of Utrecht starts near the Jacobikerk.

Births 
 February 6 – Louis I, Landgrave of Hesse, Landgrave of Hesse (1413-1458) (d. 1458)
 April 28 – Nezahualcoyotl, Acolhuan philosopher, warrior, poet and tlatoani of Texcoco (d. 1472)
 May 2 – Eleanor of Aragon, Queen of Portugal (d. 1445)
 June 7 – Ichijō Kaneyoshi, Japanese court noble (d. 1481)
 September 29 – Ferdinand the Holy Prince of Portugal (d. 1443)
 November 23 – Jean de Dunois, French nobleman and soldier, illegitimate son of Louis I (d. 1468)
 date unknown – Humphrey Stafford, 1st Duke of Buckingham, English nobleman (d. 1460)

Deaths 
 March 26 – David Stewart, Duke of Rothesay, heir to the throne of Scotland (b. 1378)
 May 3 – João Anes, Archbishop of Lisbon
 June 26 – Giovanni I Bentivoglio, Ruler of Bologna (b. 1358)
 July 13 – Jianwen Emperor of China (b. 1377)
 August 1 – Edmund of Langley, 1st Duke of York, son of King Edward III of England (b. 1341)
 September 3 – Gian Galeazzo Visconti, first Duke of Milan (b. 1351)
 date unknown
 Empress Ma (Jianwen) of China (b. 1378)
 Hywel Sele, Welsh nobleman

References